Solomon Dam is the main source of fresh water on Great Palm Island, Queensland, along with Francis Creek Dam.

See also

List of dams and reservoirs in Australia

References

Reservoirs in Queensland
Great Palm Island group
Dams in Queensland